Germany–Mongolia relations are the bilateral relations between Germany and Mongolia. Historically, the Mongolian People's Republic had close ties to the German Democratic Republic, which has persisted to this day. Mongolia established ties with the Federal Republic of Germany in 1974.

History

Early contacts
The earliest contact between Germanic and Mongol peoples are said to have occurred in 1241, during the Battle of Legnica, with the Mongols under Baidar proving victorious over a combined force of Poles, Moravians, and Germans, though the Mongols retreated back to Hungary shortly after.

20th century
After declaring independence in 1911, Mongolia had made ultimately unsuccessful overtures to establish ties with Germany through its representative in Saint Petersburg. After the Mongolian Revolution of 1921, the Mongolian People's Party made establishing economic ties with Germany a high priority, and in 1927 the first batch of 50 Mongolian students, including Dashdorjiin Natsagdorj, the founding father of modern Mongolian literature, were sent to Germany and France for education.

Cold War

East Germany 
Mongolia and East Germany established ties on April 13, 1950. The following high-level visits were undertaken between nations.

In 1989, about 300 exhibits from Mongolian museums were organized in Munich, dedicated to the "art and culture of the Mongolian equestrian people".

West Germany 
Mongolia-West Germany ties being established on January 31, 1974.

Post-communist era
Since the German reunification, a large number of visits have been held by various high-ranking German and Mongolian politicians and delegations. The following is a list of the most important state visits since 1990:

Cultural relations 
From May to June 1995, the mixed German-Mongolian culture commission met in Ulaanbaatar under the direction of Peter Truhart. On September 16, 1997, an agreement on cultural exchange and cooperation was signed between Germany and Mongolia.

Agreements 
On August 22, 1994, Germany and Mongolia passed a double taxation agreement in order to avoid double taxation of German and Mongolian citizens. A year later, in October 1995, the two countries signed a financial cooperation agreement. A delegation from the Committee on Economic Cooperation and Development of the German Bundestag traveled to Mongolia in March 1998.

Trade
Germany is Mongolia's main trading partner in the European Union, together with the United Kingdom, but on January 31, 2020 the United Kingdom left the EU.

Diaspora
In the 2010 Mongolian National Census, 3,852 Mongolian citizens were recorded to have been living in Germany.

See also 
 Foreign relations of Germany 
 Foreign relations of Mongolia

References

 
Mongolia
Bilateral relations of Mongolia